Charles Guiney (29 April 1895 – 15 December 1972) was a New Zealand cricketer. He played in two first-class matches for Canterbury in 1918/19.

See also
 List of Canterbury representative cricketers

References

External links
 

1895 births
1972 deaths
New Zealand cricketers
Canterbury cricketers
Cricketers from Christchurch